The Tiwintza detachment (also known as the Tiwinza detachment or Falso Tiwinza) was an Ecuadorian military outpost involved in the Cenepa War in Peruvian territory,  between Ecuador and Peru in 1995. The post had been a focal point of the war over disputed border claims; the settlement of the war resulted in the post and remaining Peruvian, but with its “non-sovereign ownership” transferred to Ecuador, allowing it to fly the Ecuadorian flag.

References
 

http://www.adonde.com/historia/1999_peru_ecuador.htm
http://www.enciclopediadelecuador.com/temasOpt.php?Ind=2374&Let=

Military history of Ecuador